Yale Environment 360 (abbreviated as E360) is an American online magazine focused on environmental journalism. It includes original reporting, analysis, interviews, and multimedia content. Yale Environment 360 is published by the Yale School of the Environment (YSE) at Yale University but is editorially independent.

History
James Gustave Speth, then dean of F&ES, first proposed the idea of a Yale-sponsored environmental website in 2007. Roger Cohn, former editor-in-chief of Mother Jones and executive editor of Audubon, was hired to be E360's editor. Cohn described his vision for E360 at the time as "a publication that straddles the line between more academic and specialized environmental sites and more general green lifestyle sites."

E360 officially launched on June 3, 2008 with articles by Bill McKibben, Elizabeth Kolbert, and other writers. The website was redesigned in 2017.

Yale Environment 360 is funded using a non-profit journalism model by private foundations and donors. Major donors include the Gordon and Betty Moore Foundation, the John D. and Catherine T. MacArthur Foundation, and the William Penn Foundation.

Contributors and partnerships
Yale Environment 360 solicits contributions from journalists, scientists, policymakers, and other experts.

Yale Environment 360 is part of The Guardian'''s Guardian Environment Network, which republishes content from leading environmental websites. Select articles from E360 have been translated into  Spanish  and Portuguese by Universia.

Awards and accolades
"Leveling Appalachia," a video produced by E360, was awarded best video at the 2010 National Magazine Awards. It was the first video ever to receive a National Magazine Award. E360 was also given Online Journalism Awards from the Online News Association in 2009, 2010, and 2011, and has received multiple Webby Award nominations.The Warriors of Qiugang'', a short film directed by Ruby Yang and produced by Thomas Lennon, was co-produced and hosted by E360. It was nominated for an Academy Award for Best Documentary (Short Subject) at the 83rd Academy Awards.

See also 
 Yale School of Forestry & Environmental Studies

References

External links 
 
 
 

American environmental websites
Magazines published in Connecticut
Yale University publications
Magazines established in 2008
Environmental magazines
Mass media in New Haven, Connecticut